Senator Alley may refer to:

John B. Alley (1817–1896), Massachusetts State Senate
Larry Alley (born 1948), Kansas State Senate
Zeb Alley (1928–2013), North Carolina State Senate